The 2018–19 Liga FPD season, also known as Campeonato Banco Popular for sponsorship reasons, is the 98th since its establishment. The tournament is the second since the 2006–07 season to use the Apertura and Clausura names to their short tournaments, marking a departure from the Invierno and Verano tournaments.

The Voit Lummo is the official match ball of the tournament. Deportivo Saprissa are the defending champions, after defeating Herediano in the Clausura 2018 tournament.

Teams and Structure Changes
A total of 12 teams will contest the league, including 11 sides from the 2017–18 season, one team promoted from the Liga de Ascenso.

San Carlos  were promoted for the first time to the Liga FPD after defeating Jicaral in the Liga de Ascenso final, thus replacing Liberia in the Liga FPD.

For this season, the league has changed the playoff format. The top 4 teams in the regular season will progress to a two-legged knockout tournament. If the same team that wins the regular season wins the playoff, that team wins the season championship immediately. Should a different team win the playoff than won the regular season, those two teams will meet in a two-legged Grand Final for the season championship.

Personnel, kits and Stadia

Note: Table lists in alphabetical order.

Managerial changes

Before the start of the season

During the Apertura season

Between the Apertura and Clausura season

During the Clausura season

Apertura
The Apertura tournament will be played in the second half of 2018, starting on 21 July.

Regular season
The regular season began on 21 July 2018 and ended on 11 November 2018.

On 17 October 2018, the match between Limón and Grecia was suspended in the 25th minute due to a waterlogged pitch. The remaining 65 minutes were played the next day.

Standings

Results

Playoffs

Semifinals

First legs

Second legs

Finals

First leg

Second leg

Grand final
If the regular season winners are unable to win the playoffs, a double-legged final will be played against the playoffs winner in order to determine the champions of the Apertura tournament. The team with the better accumulated record over the regular season and playoffs will host the second leg.

First leg

Second leg

Clausura

Regular season
The regular season began on 12 January 2019 and will end of 28 April 2019.

Standings

Results

Playoffs

Semifinals

First legs

Second legs

San Carlos progress 4-3 on aggregate.

Saprissa progress 3-2 on aggregate.

Finals

First leg

Second leg

1-1 on aggregate. San Carlos wins 1-0 on away goals.

Grand final
If the regular season winners are unable to win the playoffs, a double-legged final will be played against the playoffs winner in order to determine the champions of the Clausura tournament. The team with the better accumulated record over the regular season and playoffs will host the second leg. For this tournament, San Carlos won both the regular season and playoffs, so they were declared champions without a grand final.

Aggregate table

List of foreign players in the league 
This is a list of foreign players in the 2018–19 season. The following players:

 Have played at least one game for the respective club.
 Have not been capped for the Costa Rica national football team on any level, independently from the birthplace

A new rule was introduced this season, that clubs can have four foreign players per club and can only add a new player if there is an injury or a player is released and it's before the close of the season transfer window. 

Alajuelense
  Abdiel Arroyo 
  Alexander López
  Luis Garrido
  Roger Rojas
  Henry Figueroa
  Maalique Foster  
  Facundo Zabala 

Carmelita
  Amir Waithe
  Jonathan Camio

Cartaginés
  Hernán Fener
  Nelson Barahona 
  Julio Cruz González
  Juan Felipe Delgadillo
  Marcel Hernández Campanioni

Grecia
  Paulo Cézar
  Byron Bonilla
  Víctor Pérez
  Lucas Giovagnoli

Herdiano
  Aldo Magaña 
  Omar Arellano
  Édgar Gerardo Lugo
   Antonio Pedroza

Guadalupe 
  Lautaro Ayala
  Sebastián González
  Alejandro Abasolo
  Moisés Arce 

Limón
  Carlos Palacios
  Ronald Benavides
  Junior Murillo
  Richard Dixon 
  Humberto Ward 
  Javier Clavijo 

Pérez Zeledón
  Leandro Gastón Rodríguez 
  Javier Liendo
  Pablo Azcurra
  Lauro Cazal
  Lucio Barroca

San Carlos
  Manuel González 
  Ismael Gómez
  Fabrizio Ronchetti 
  Jonathan Soto
  Claudio Daniel Pérez

Santos de Guápiles
  Francisco Flores
  Victor Griffith
  Ronaldo Dinolis 
  Fabrizio Ronchetti

Deportivo Saprissa
  Mariano Torres
  Alejandro Cabral
  Tássio Maia
  Aubrey David
  Rubilio Castillo

Universidad
  Andres Riascos
  Jhon Ibargüen 
  Fernando Cárdenas 
  Daniel Ocampo 
  Sebastián Bermúdez
  Román Calvo
  Luis Rodríguez 

 (player released during the Apertura season)
 (player released between the Apertura and Clausura seasons)
 (player released during the Clausura season)

External links
  (CR Hoy -Spanish)
  (Nacion - Spanish)
   (Everardo herrera - Spanish)

References

Liga FPD seasons
Costa Rica
2018–19 in Costa Rican football